This is a list of Australian soccer transfers for the 2021–22 A-League Women. Only moves featuring at least one A-League Women club are listed.

Transfers
All players without a flag are Australian. Clubs without a flag are clubs participating in the A-League Women.

Pre-season

Mid-season

Re-signings

Notes

References

A-League Women transfers
Football transfers summer 2021
Football transfers winter 2021–22
transfers
transfers
transfers